The 2019–20 NC State Wolfpack men's basketball team represented North Carolina State University during the 2019–20 NCAA Division I men's basketball season. The Wolfpack were led by third-year head coach Kevin Keatts and played its home games at PNC Arena in Raleigh, North Carolina as members of the Atlantic Coast Conference (ACC). After winning its second round match-up with Pittsburgh in the 2020 ACC men's basketball tournament and before its quarterfinal match-up with Duke, the tournament was canceled due to concerns with the COVID-19 pandemic. Later that afternoon, the NCAA announced that all Winter and Spring championships would be canceled, including the NCAA tournament. They finished the season 20–12, 10–10 in ACC play to finish in a tie for sixth place.

Previous season
The Wolfpack finished the 2018–19 season 24–12, 9–9 in ACC play to finish in a tie for eighth place. They lost in the quarterfinals of the ACC tournament to Virginia. They received a bid to the NIT where they lost in the quarterfinals to Lipscomb.

Offseason

Departures

Incoming transfers

2019 recruiting class

Source:

2020 Recruiting class

Source:

Roster

Roster Source:

Schedule and results

Source:

|-
!colspan=12 style=|Exhibition

|-
!colspan=12 style=| Regular season

|-
!colspan=12 style=| ACC tournament

Schedule Source:

References

NC State Wolfpack men's basketball seasons
Nc State
NC State Wolfpack men's basketball
NC State Wolfpack men's basketball